WYDE (1260  kHz) is a commercial AM radio station.  The station is owned by the Crawford Broadcasting Company and airs a Southern Gospel radio format with some Christian talk and teaching programs.  It is simulcast with WYDE-FM 92.5 MHz in Cordova.

The transmitter is located near the eastern edge of downtown Birmingham, and its studios are in Homewood.  By day, it transmits with 5,000 watts, but at night, to avoid interfering with other stations on AM 1260, it greatly reduces power to 41 watts.  Programming is also heard on FM translator 95.3 W237EK.  The station is also heard on co-owned 93.7 WDJC-FM-HD4.  WYDE broadcasts in the HD Radio format.

Station history
The station broadcasting at 1260 AM in Birmingham signed on in 1953 as WCRT, carrying a Middle of the Road format.  Due to Federal Communications Commission (FCC) restrictions, WCRT was a daytimer and was required to sign off at sunset.  The owners of WCRT were also instrumental in the launch of WCFT-TV 33 in Tuscaloosa; hence the similarity in the call signs.  In 1961 WCRT launched a companion FM station.  Initially, WCRT-FM was a simulcast of its AM partner.  In the 1970s the FM station relaunched as easy listening WQEZ; today that station is heritage adult contemporary station WMJJ.

During the 1970s, WCRT was an adult standards station that used the syndicated Music of Your Life format.  In 1982, sister station WQEZ-FM was sold, and by 1983, the owners of WCRT were looking to get out of the radio business.  Later that year, the station was sold to a group of Christian businessmen who planned to drop adult standards in favor of contemporary Christian music.  Before the sales transaction could be completed, a fire destroyed the station’s studios and offices, and WCRT was forced off the air for several months.

In August 1983, WCRT returned to the air with the new on-air name "Love 1260" and the new contemporary Christian music format.  A weak signal that did not reach the suburbs at night, the waning popularity of AM radio, and competition from WDJC-FM were among several reasons why Love 1260 was not particularly successful.  Less than three years later, Love 1260 dropped contemporary Christian music in favor of an adult contemporary format.

In 1986, WCRT dropped adult contemporary music in favor of an all-oldies format. It continued with this format until 1991, when it dropped music programming in favor of an all business news format and new call letters WCEO.  The business news format continued until 1994, when Crawford Broadcasting Company, the owners of WDJC-FM, bought the station and launched a “Christian country’ music format on the station, which was relaunched as WDJC.  Later in the 1990s, the station changed formats again, this time to black gospel music, placing it in direct competition with format leader WAGG and several other stations.  In late 1997 this format was dropped and the on air moniker "Radio Bible University" was adopted.  The station was brokered out to Christian preaching and teaching programs, along with some local talk shows.  The "Dixie Gospel Caravan with Wayne Wallace" was rebroadcast from sister station WDJC-FM every evening on WDJC due to its low power.

In 1999, 1260 AM in Birmingham returned to its roots.  Christian programming was dropped, and the station once again became an adult standards station with the call letters WLGS.  Known on the air as “Legends 1260”, the station achieved moderate ratings success.  By 2001, the station added some oldies music to its playlist, and by 2002, it had segued into a full-fledged oldies station.  In 2003, the station dropped the oldies format and became a full-time simulcast partner of WYDE-FM, rebroadcasting the FM station's conservative talk radio format.  The simulcast continued for the next three years.

In October 2006, WYDE changed its call letters to WLGD, and returned to the music format it had employed in the early 2000s (decade).  Once again, the station was known on the air as "Legends 1260" and was an adult standards station, focusing primarily on vocal music from the 1950s, 1960s and 1970s.  Long-time Birmingham radio veterans Burt and Kurt, formerly of WSGN, WMJJ-Magic 96.5 and WODL-Oldies 106.9, headlined the new station's morning show.

In July 2007, the station changed it calls once again back to WYDE and began simulcasting the new Classic Hits station WYDE 101.1 FM with Burt and Kurt in the morning drive spot.  The classic hits format was dropped in early 2009 for a return to talk radio.

On November 5, 2018 WYDE changed its format from talk to Christian inspirational music, simulcasting WYDE-FM 92.5 FM Cordova.

See also
List of radio stations in Alabama

References

External links
FCC History Cards for WYDE

YDE
Radio stations established in 1953
YDE
1953 establishments in Alabama